Tămășești River may refer to one of the following rivers in Romania

 Tămășești River (Sălaj) - tributary of the Sălaj
 Tămășești - tributary of the Zam in Hunedoara County